Idool 2004 was the second season of the Flemish version of the Idol series. It was won by Joeri Fransen, who could not follow the footsteps of former winner Peter Evrard and only release one album before he was dropped by his record company. 
However, second runner-up Sandrine Van Handenhoven, who was a longtime favorite throughout the season above the winner and the runner-up, enjoyed an ongoing success as a singer as well as the host of the Flemish Big Brother programme and therefore is now considered as the unofficial winner of Idool 2005 as she almost represented Belgium in the Eurovision Song Contest in 2008, coming in close 2nd in the national final.
Laura Ramaekers has already been a semifinalist on Idool 2003.

About

Finals

Finalists
(ages stated at time of contest)

Finals Elimination Chart

Live show details

Heat 1 (19 September 2004)

Notes
Born Meirlaen, Sarah Cain and Joeri Fransen advanced to the top 10 of the competition. The other 7 contestants were eliminated.
Siham Ben Taleb returned for a second chance at the top 10 in the Wildcard Round.

Heat 2 (26 September 2004)

Notes
Annelies Cappaert, Laura D'Heedene and Wouter De Clerck advanced to the top 10 of the competition. The other 7 contestants were eliminated.
Janina Van Caneghem and Mai Nuyts returned for a second chance at the top 10 in the Wildcard Round.

Heat 3 (3 October 2004)

Notes
Maarten Cox, Laura Ramaekers and Sandrine Van Handenhoven advanced to the top 10 of the competition. The other 7 contestants were eliminated.
Sarah Cappaert returned for a second chance at the top 10 in the Wildcard Round.

Wildcard round (10 October 2004)

Notes
Janina Van Caneghem received most votes, and completed the top 10.

Live Show 1 (17 October 2004)
Theme: My Idol

Live Show 2 (24 October 2004)
Theme: Disco Hits

Live Show 3 (31 October 2004)
Theme: Dutch Songs

Live Show 4 (7 November 2004)
Theme: Film Songs

Live Show 5 (14 November 2004)
Theme: One Hit Wonders

Live Show 6 (21 November 2004)
Theme: Big Band

Live Show 7 (28 November 2004)
Theme: Rock Hits

Live Show 8: Semi-final (5 December 2004)
Theme: Unplugged

Live final (12 December 2004)

Idool (TV series)
2004 Belgian television seasons